Amy Sohn is a Brooklyn-based author, columnist and screenwriter. Her first two novels were Run Catch Kiss (1999) and My Old Man (2004), both published by Simon & Schuster, and a companion guide to television's Sex and the City, Sex and the City: Kiss and Tell (Pocket Books).

Early life
She graduated from Hunter College High School in 1991 and Brown University with an A.B. in 1995.

Career
Sohn's novels include Prospect Park West (2009) and its sequel Motherland (2012), about four women who live in the Park Slope neighborhood of Brooklyn. In 2014, she published The Actress (Simon & Schuster), which Slate called "a valuable contribution to the canon of Hollywood fiction—a canon which is actually, incredibly, more sorely lacking strong female points of view than even Hollywood movies.”

She was a contributing editor at New York magazine, where she wrote the weekly "Mating" column. From 1996 to 1999 she wrote a dating column, "Female Trouble", for New York Press. Her articles and reviews have also appeared in The Nation, Playboy, Harper's Bazaar, Men's Journal and The New York Times Book Review. In 2012 she cowrote the book It's Not About the Pom-Poms with Laura Vikmanis.

She wrote the films Pagans, which is in post-production, and Spin the Bottle, available through TLA Releasing. She cocreated, wrote and starred in the Oxygen television series Avenue Amy and appears on television as a pundit on popular culture.

In 2022, she became a press secretary for New York City Mayor Eric Adams.

Works 
Novels

 Run Catch Kiss. Simon & Schuster, 1999.
 My Old Man. Simon & Schuster, 2004.
 Prospect Park West. Simon & Schuster, 2009.
 Motherland. Simon & Schuster, 2012.
 The Actress. Simon & Schuster, 2014.
 CBD! OR Books, 2019.
 Brooklyn Bailey, the Missing Dog. Dial Books, 2020.

Screenplays

 Spin the Bottle. 1998.
 Pagans. 2004.

Nonfiction

 The Man Who Hated Women: Sex, Censorship, and Civil Liberties in the Gilded Age. Farrar, Straus and Giroux, 2021.

Further reading

References

External links
Official website
Interview with Amy Sohn A Park Slope Novel Seems a Little Too Real by Steven Kurutz, New York Times, September 9, 2009
 New webside about Amy Sohn's twelfth book and first work of narrative non-fiction

1973 births
Living people
Brown University alumni
20th-century American novelists
21st-century American novelists
American women novelists
Screenwriters from New York (state)
American columnists
Hunter College High School alumni
The New York Times people
New York Press people
Writers from Brooklyn
The Nation (U.S. magazine) people
American women screenwriters
American women columnists
20th-century American women writers
21st-century American women writers
Novelists from New York (state)
American women non-fiction writers
20th-century American non-fiction writers
21st-century American non-fiction writers